Tanore is an Upazila of Rajshahi District in the Division of Rajshahi, Bangladesh. Tanore police station was established in February 1869 and it was declared sub-district or upazila in 1983.

Geography
Tanore is 30 kilometers from Rajshahi city. It is surrounded by Niamatpur Upazila and Manda Upazila of Naogaon District to the north, Mohanpur Upazila of Rajshahi district to the east, Paba Upazila and Godagari Upazila of Rajshahi district to the south, Chapai Nawabganj Sadar Upazila and Nachol Upazila of Chapai Nawabganj District to the west. There is a river at Tanore Upazila called Shiba River.  The main river is the Shiba.

Demographics 
It has 47,425 households.

History
The literal meaning of tanore in the Bengali language is "dismal area." In ancient times this area was a desert-like place with few trees or people. As time went by, the area became more habitable and people began to settle there. Indigenous tribal groups, including the Santhal and Mahali lived there for many years.

Independence war
Tanore Upazila was freed from Pakistan on 30 November 1971. A last battle was fought on the night of 29 November. Safikur Rahman Raja was a final year student at Rajshahi University at that time and led the freedom fighters.

Six fighters were captured by Pakistani army with the help of local collaborators (Rajakars) near the river port of Buruj on 29 November. They were tortured in Tanore police station. A guerrilla team consisting of 30 to 35 freedom fighters divided into four groups attacked the police station that night to free them. They were led by Safikur Rahman Raja. Although the freedom fighters had less ammunition, they forced the enemy to retreat and freed the captives. Three fighters were killed while Sirajul Islam, alias Hanif Mridha, survived his wounds. The martyrs were Monayem Monjur, student of Rajshahi Polytechnic institute, Muhammad Islam, student of class ten of Maskatadighi school at Katakhali and an indigenous youth whose name was not known. Pakistan army withdrew their soldiers and police forces from this area on 30 November. Safikur Rahman Raja hoisted the flag of independent Bangladesh at Tanore on 17 December. A place of execution is located at Gollapara Bazaar in Tanore that bears the testimony of oppressions, tortures and atrocities done by autocratic Pakistan army.

Demographics
At the 2011 Bangladesh census, Tanore had a population of 191,330 (94,041 male and 97,289 female). Males constitute 49.15% of the population, and females 50.85%. Population density is 648/km2. Tanore has an average literacy rate of 48.8%  (males 51.1% and Females 46.7%) (7+ years). Muslims comprise 162,018 (84.68%), Hindus 15,152 (7.92%), Christians 9,329 (4.87%), Buddhists 17 (0.01%), others 4,814 (2.52%).

The indigenous Santhal people live there.

Culture 
The area has 510 mosques, 200 Eid-gahs, 22 temples, 16 churches and 1 Pagoda.

Economy
Agricultural covers approximately 22,665 hectares including 21,295  cultivable hectares. The main crops are paddy, potato, wheat, maize, tomato, brinjal, onion and garlic. Rice is the staple food. Mango and jack fruit are cultivated.

Administration
Tanore Upazila is divided into Mundumala Municipality, Tanore Municipality, and seven union parishads: Badhair, Chanduria, Kalma, Kamargaon, Pachandar, Saranjai, and Talanda. The union parishads are subdivided into 211 mauzas and 169 villages.

Education
The literacy rate of Tanore Upazila is 48.8%. The area offers 127 primary schools (49 government and 78 non-government), 62 high/junior-high schools, 18 colleges (including 2 technical and vocational colleges) and 28 madrasas.

Transport
The Tanore sub-district can be reached by road. No railway connection is present. Tanore Upazila Parisad is approximately 30 kilometers away from the Rajshahi Bus stand. In the rainy season, the Shiba river is used to transport goods to this upazila. The area has 216 km of metalled road, 51 km semi-metalled road and 427 km unmetalled road.

Notable people
 Omor Faruk Chowdhury has been Member of Parliament for constituency Rajshahi-1 since 2008.
 Mahiya Mahi, cinema heroine

See also
 Upazilas of Bangladesh
 Districts of Bangladesh
 Divisions of Bangladesh

References

External links
 Website of upazila administration
 Tanore Upazila in Banglapedia

Upazilas of Rajshahi District